New York University Shanghai (NYU Shanghai) is China's first Sino-US research university and the third degree-granting campus of New York University (NYU). Jointly established by NYU and East China Normal University with the support of the city of Shanghai in 2012, it was the first US university to receive independent registration from China's Ministry of Education. While classes are in English, some proficiency in Chinese is required for graduation. Upon graduation, students will receive a bachelor's degree conferred by New York University - the same degree awarded at the New York campus - as well as a Chinese degree recognized by the Chinese government.

Students are required to study away at one of NYU's 12 Global Academic Centers and 2 degree-granting campuses in order to foster cross-cultural understanding and communication.

History 
The school opened to students in September 2013. Of the class of 294 students, 51% came from The People's Republic of China, with the remaining 49% coming from other countries around the world. During the 2013–2014 academic year, NYU Shanghai students studied at East China Normal University while the official NYU campus in Pudong was built. The Pudong campus was completed in the summer of 2014. Students moved into the new building at the start of the fall 2014 semester. Currently, the NYU Shanghai campus in Pudong serves NYU Shanghai students, study abroad students from New York, Abu Dhabi, and non-NYU affiliated colleges in other countries, as well as a number of NYU law students.

During the 2019 - 2020 academic year, the commencement ceremony was moved online due to the ongoing COVID-19 public health restrictions. Jack Ma, the founder of Alibaba and the commencement speaker of the ceremony, called upon students to find “a common path forward, a common path for cooperation” between China and the United States in his commencement speech. He was also a recipient of NYU Shanghai Chancellor's Medal of Honor.

Timeline 
Sept 2012: NYU Shanghai's registration as an independent institution approved by China's Ministry of Education.

Sept 2013: NYU Shanghai opens its doors to its first undergraduate class.

Jan 2014: NYU Shanghai's Chancellor Yu awarded 2013 Shanghai Education Notable Person of the Year Award.

May 2015: Chancellor Yu Lizhong delivers speech at the United Nations titled "Education for the Globalized World".

March 2019: First NYU Shanghai Student wins the prestigious Knight-Hennessy Scholarship.

May 2019: NYU Shanghai breaks ground on new Qiantan campus.

May 2019: 2003 Economics Noble Laureate Robert Engle was appointed as the co-director of Volatility Institute at NYU Shanghai.

April 2019: NYU Shanghai has accepted 966 international students from a pool of 13,807 applications worldwide for the Class of 2023, resulting in an international acceptance rate of 7%.

Oct 2019: Five Nobel Laureates, among 35 other international scholars, gathered at NYU Shanghai to issue a joint statement amidst the worsening US-China trade tensions.

June 2020: Chancellor Yu Lizhong retires. Tong Shijun, a professor of philosophy at East China Normal University (ECNU) was named as the new Chancellor of NYU Shanghai.

Logo 
NYU Shanghai's logo is adapted from NYU's torch logo, using the top half of the torch to form the petals of a magnolia flower, the official flower of Shanghai. The logo is meant to represent NYU's footing in Shanghai.

Administration 
Yu Lizhong, former president of the East China Normal University (ECNU), was named Chancellor of NYU Shanghai, he also served as Party Committee Secretary of the university. Jeffrey S. Lehman, former president of Cornell University and dean of the University of Michigan Law School, was named Vice Chancellor.

In June 2020, Tong Shijun, a professor of philosophy at East China Normal University (ECNU) was named as the new Chancellor of NYU Shanghai after Yu Lizhong retired from his position after an 8-year reign at the post.

Campus

ECNU Zhongbei Campus (2013-) 
The Class of 2017 of NYUSH spent their first academic year in the Physics-Geography-Biology Building in the Zhongbei Campus of ECNU in Putuo District in 2013, as the Academic Building at Century Avenue was still under construction at that time.

After moving in to the Century Avenue Campus in 2014, the building continued to serve as a campus of NYU Shanghai. The NYU-ECNU Joint Research Institutes are located in the campus.

Century Avenue (2014-2022) 

From 2014 to 2022, NYU Shanghai was based at 1555 Century Ave. in Pudong, Shanghai. The main campus was contained in a single building, the Academic Center, a 15-story building with two underground floors. There is also an academic library that offers virtual and in-person reference services.

Qiantan (2023-) 
The groundbreaking ceremony was held for the 114,000 square meters new campus in Qiantan on May 30, 2019. The Qiantan Campus was designed and built by architectural firm Kohn Pedersen Fox (KPF). The design features four buildings arranged in a pinwheel shape reminiscent of NYU Shanghai's logo, connected as one building above the fifth floor. The university hoped to move up to 4,000 undergraduate and graduate students into the new campus since Fall, 2022.

However, as the construction of the Qiantan Campus was affected by the 2022 Shanghai Lockdown, the university had to delay its move-in to Spring 2023. Under the state of incomplete construction, the campus was partly open to students on January 30, 2023. However, many parents and students believed the campus was unsafe for students, and as such the local government and school administration moved classes online after being open for five days. The campus was closed to students until February 24, 2023 to allow for construction to proceed at a faster rate.

Residence Halls

Jinqiao and Pusan (2015-2022) 
NYU Shanghai had two dormitories located within Pudong New Area when the main campus was at Century Avenue. 

The Jinqiao Residence Halls, which were north of the Campus, consisted of 3 buildings in Green Center Towers and was home to the majority of the students. The residence halls were a 25 minute shuttle ride from the Academic Building, and was served by shuttle buses scheduled around the academic schedule. Jinqiao Road Station of  Metro  Line 6 next to the halls provided convenient transportation to the students as well.

The relatively small Pusan Road residence halls were south of the Academic Building. They were also a 25 minute commute to the Academic Building via shuttle bus, which ran based on the academic calendar.

Jingyao (2023-) 
Jingyao Apartments in Beicai Area will become the new residence halls as the school moves to Qiantan.

Academics

Undergraduate programs 
NYU Shanghai offers 19 majors, and numerous multidisciplinary minors and specializations.

In order to graduate, undergraduate students have to spend at least one semester studying away in New York, Abu Dhabi or at one of NYU's 12 study away centers in cities around the world.

In April 2019, NYU Shanghai has accepted 966 international students from a pool of 13,807 applications worldwide for the Class of 2023, resulting in an international acceptance rate of 7%.

For the Class of 2024, NYU Shanghai admitted 1,533 students from a total pool of over 13,000 applicants. The admitted Class of 2024 was one of NYU Shanghai's most geographically diverse classes, with students coming from 44 US states and 96 countries around the world.

Graduate and advanced education programs 
The school also offers Masters programs and PhD programs.

As of 2021, NYU Shanghai offers 7 master's and 11 PhD programs jointly with other NYU Schools.

Master's Programs 

 MS in Data Analytics and Business Computing is a one-year full-time master's program in collaboration with NYU Stern School of Business
 MS in Quantitative Finance is a one-year full-time master's program in collaboration with NYU Stern School of Business
 MSW in Social Work is a two-year program in collaboration with NYU Silver School of Social Work
 MA in TESOL (Teaching English to Speakers of Other Languages) is a two-year part-time program in collaboration with NYU Steinhardt School of Culture, Education and Human Development
 MA in Interactive Media Arts is a one-year full-time master's program in collaboration with NYU Tisch School of the Arts

PhD Programs 
NYU Shanghai's PhD programs are offered jointly with other schools and departments of NYU, including the NYU Graduate School of Arts and Science, the NYU Tandon School of Engineering, and the NYU Robert F. Wagner Graduate School of Public Service, in the following subjects: Biology, Chemistry, Computer Science, Data Science, Electrical Engineering, Mathematics, Neural Science, Physics, Public Administration, Sociology, Transportation Planning and Engineering.

Research centers 

NYU Shanghai houses 10 research institutes in collaboration with East China Normal University (ECNU), they are listed as follows.
 NYU-ECNU Center for Computational Chemistry at NYU Shanghai
 NYU-ECNU Institute of Brain and Cognitive Science at NYU Shanghai
 NYU-ECNU Institute for Social Development at NYU Shanghai
 NYU-ECNU Institute of Mathematical Sciences at NYU Shanghai
 NYU-ECNU Institute of Physics at NYU Shanghai
 Volatility Institute at NYU Shanghai
 Center for Applied Social and Economic Research (CASER) 
 Center for Global Asia at NYU Shanghai
 Center for Data Science and Analytics
 Center for Business Education and Research
 Center for Global Health Equity

Athletics 
NYU Shanghai's mascot is a purple Qilin designed by a student and decided by a popular vote, beating out other designs including a panda, dragon, lion, and original creature named Spark. NYU Shanghai offers competitive sports teams for badminton, tennis, basketball, fencing, flag football, soccer, and volleyball, competing against local universities and high schools in various leagues and city-sponsored events. NYU Shanghai also offers recreational activities such as yoga retreats, outdoor hikes, go-karting, and basketball tournaments, as well as semester-long group fitness classes including yoga, aerobics, cardio, strength conditioning, tai chi, and various dance classes such as traditional Chinese dance, K-pop dance, hip-hop dance, and salsa. These fitness classes meet weekly and offerings change from semester to semester.

Notable faculty 
 Chen Jian,  Distinguished Global Network Professor of History at New York University Shanghai, and visiting professor from Cornell University, Chinese history and international relations
 Jeffrey Lehman, former president of Cornell, Dean of University of Michigan law school
 Lin Fanghua, Affiliated Silver Professor of Mathematics
 Yu Lizhong, former president of East China Normal University
 Charles M. Newman, Affiliated Silver Professor of Mathematics, Director of the NYU-ECNU Institute of Mathematical Sciences at NYU Shanghai
 Clay Shirky, Associate Professor; studies social media.
 Joanna Waley-Cohen, former head of the NYU New York History department
 Eitan Zemel, associate Chancellor for Strategy and Dean of Business
 Paul Romer, winner of 2018 Nobel prize in Economics
 Benjamin H. Bratton, philosopher of technology.

Controversies 
In 2018, the university introduced a Civic Education Course. The annual two-week course, executed during the University's Christmas break every year, is mandatory for all Chinese passport holders attending NYU Shanghai. These additions have been criticized as a step away from the university's academic freedom.

In 2021, in response to a discrimination lawsuit brought by an NYU Shanghai professor, the university has stated that it is not controlled by NYU.

See also 
New York University Abu Dhabi
New York University
East China Normal University

References

External links 
 Official site

New York University
Universities and colleges in Shanghai
Educational institutions established in 2012
2012 establishments in China
East China Normal University
Kohn Pedersen Fox buildings